Shaftesbury High School is a public high school located in the Tuxedo neighbourhood of Winnipeg, Manitoba. It has a population of 750 students from Tuxedo, Charleswood, and Linden Woods. They are included in the Pembina Trails School Division's International Student Program (ISP) and recently acquired the RHA Nationals Boys Hockey Team.

The school opened in September 1968.

International Student Program 
Shaftesbury High participates in the Pembina Trails School Division (PTSD) International student Program (ISP). Typically they host up to 40 students from all across the world to teach foreign teens Canadian culture along with teaching Canadian teens foreign culture. This also helps teach all students cultural awareness.

Scholarships and awards 
Various awards and scholarships are available at Shaftesbury High School. These awards are certified by universities and the PTSD.
 Pembina Trails School Division Academic Award of Excellence
 Pembina Trails School Division Citizenship Awards
 Chown Centennial Scholarship
 Shaftesbury Titans Award
 Governor General's Award
(Note: Awards are exact names of the award handed out yearly)

Graduation requirements 
The Manitoba Government requires students to meet these requirements in order to graduate.

 Minimum 30 Credits
 Completed All Compulsory Courses
 Minimum one Grade 11 Optional course credit and two Grade 12 Optional course credits.

Honours courses 
Shaftesbury also offers honours courses that run for both semesters and is a faster paced course along with a much tougher level of work. If a student is in grade 10 they will complete both the grade 10 honours course and grade 11 courses. This puts them ahead of students and gives them an opportunity to take more courses in grade 11 & grade 12. Students opt into these courses through select invites.

Sports 
The school competes in the following sports.

Badminton
Basketball (females and males)
Bowling (females and males)
Cross country running
Curling
Golf
Hockey (females and males)
Rugby (females and males)
Soccer (indoor and outdoor, females and males)
Track and field (indoor, outdoor, and Manitoba Marathon)
Ultimate Frisbee 
Volleyball (females and males)

Hockey teams and programs 
Shaftesbury offers a wide variety of hockey. There is a hockey skills academy run by Hockey Canada. Students who choose to sign up for this course will receive one credit. Students may only get a total of two credits from this program. Students are allowed to substitute gym class out with this course if they have taken this course twice already. Note: Students must take an online health class provided by Manitoba Education.

The boys hockey team participates in the Winnipeg High School Hockey League (WHSHL). Students may have to leave school early for games and/or miss entire school days for hockey tournaments. The team is coached by the hockey skills academy teacher to ensure the students receive high level training throughout their season.

The girls hockey team participates in the female high school league. Much like the boys team they may have to leave school early and/or miss entire school days for games and tournaments. The team is coached by one of the math teachers and the second hockey skills academy coach.

The RHA Nationals Boy Prep team is run by the Rink Hockey Academy. They do not follow the same schedule as normal students would nor do they follow the average hockey player schedule. They typically practice four-five times a week and games taking place on the weekends. These students may gain more exposure to scouts and possibly advanced to higher levels of hockey.

The school also offers a R1 Nationals Prep Female team.

Championships won 

2020 – Boys Hockey Platinum Promotions Division Tier II
2019 – Boys Hockey Winnipeg Free Press Division
2011 – Boys Indoor Soccer Division B
2011 – Boys Hockey Winnipeg Free Press Division
2011 – Girls Junior Varsity Tier 2 Basketball
2010 – Boys Varsity Basketball Division 2
2010 – Girls Varsity Tier 2 Basketball

Notable alumni
 Madison Bowey – Professional Hockey player for the Vancouver Canucks and Stanley Cup Champion with the Washington Capitals in 2018.
 Brian Bowman – 43rd Mayor of Winnipeg
 Cody Eakin – Professional hockey player for the Buffalo Sabres
 Steven Fletcher – Politician
 Scott Glennie – Former professional ice hockey player
 Kaitlyn Lawes – Curler – Gold medalist with Team Canada, 2014 Sochi Olympic games
 Todd MacCulloch – Former NBA center for the Philadelphia 76ers and the New Jersey Nets
 Sara Orlesky – TSN news reporter
 Leanne Spencer – Supermodel of the World Titleholder of 1996
 Nia Vardalos – Actress

References

High schools in Winnipeg
Educational institutions in Canada with year of establishment missing
Tuxedo, Winnipeg